Paul O'Flynn (born 2 August 1985 in Ballyclough, County Cork) is an Irish sportsperson.

He plays Gaelic football with his local club Ballyclough and has been a member of the Cork senior inter-county team since 2009. He captained the CIT victorious Sigerson winning side to their first title. He is the son of Thomas and Lily O'Flynn and has two brothers David and  Thomas.

References

1985 births
Living people
Ballyclough Gaelic footballers
Cork inter-county Gaelic footballers